Sainte-Martine is a municipality in Beauharnois-Salaberry Regional County Municipality in the Montérégie region of Quebec, Canada. The population as of the Canada 2016 Census was 5,461. The municipality is made up of a large northern section and a small unattached southern area that was known as the municipality of Saint-Paul-de-Châteauguay until its merger with Sainte-Martine on September 9, 1999.

History
Sainte-Martine is named in honor of Martina of Rome, martyred in 226. Being already settled and recognize as Sainte-Martine for many years, the status of the municipality was officialized on July 1, 1855, as the parish municipality of Sainte-Martine. The municipality lost a section of its territory in 1885 for the creation of the parish of Très-Saint-Sacrement. It also lost a sizeable part in 1937 when Saint-Paul-de-Châteauguay split from Saint-Martine to become its own municipality, but it was eventually reattached to Sainte-Martine in 1999.

Geography

Communities
The following locations reside within the municipality's boundaries:
Laberge – a hamlet located along Quebec Route 205 in the north part of the municipality.
La Ferme – a residential area located along Quebec Route 138.
Le Domaine-de-la-Pêche-au-Saumon – a residential area located along Quebec Route 138.
Le Méandre – a residential area located along Quebec Route 138.

Demographics

Population

Language

Transportation
The Exo du Haut-Saint-Laurent sector provides commuter and local bus services.

See also
 Beauharnois-Salaberry Regional County Municipality
 Chateauguay River
 Rivière de l'Esturgeon (Châteauguay River)
 List of municipalities in Quebec

References

External links

 Sainte-Martine official website

Municipalities in Quebec
Incorporated places in Beauharnois-Salaberry Regional County Municipality